Zhu Qingyi (born December 1948) is a retired lieutenant general (zhong jiang) of the People's Liberation Army Air Force (PLAAF) of China. He served as commander of the Lanzhou Military Region Air Force and deputy commander of the Lanzhou MR.

Biography
Zhu was born in December 1948 in Yongjia County, Zhejiang Province. He graduated from the Air Force Command Academy.

Zhu served as commander of the PLAAF 30th Fighter Division, and chief of staff of Dalian Air Base. He became assistant chief of staff of the PLAAF in June 1990, and was transferred to the PLA General Staff Department (GSD) in December 1994, working in air force affairs. He attained the rank of major general in July 2000, and was promoted to director of the Political Department of the GSD in May 2005.

In August 2006, he became commander of the Lanzhou Military Region Air Force and concurrently deputy commander of the Lanzhou MR. He was promoted to lieutenant general the following year. He retired from active service in February 2011.

Zhu was a member of the 11th National People's Congress.

References

1948 births
Living people
People's Liberation Army generals from Zhejiang
People's Liberation Army Air Force generals
Delegates to the 11th National People's Congress
Politicians from Wenzhou
People's Republic of China politicians from Zhejiang